The 1932–33 Magyar Kupa (English: Hungarian Cup) was the 15th season of Hungary's annual knock-out cup football competition.

Final

See also
 1932–33 Nemzeti Bajnokság I

References

External links
 Official site 
 soccerway.com

1932–33 in Hungarian football
1932–33 domestic association football cups
1932-33